The William Perrin House is a historic house in western Andover, Massachusetts.  It was built between 1850 and 1852 by William Perrin on land owned by his wife's family.  The house features Greek Revival and Gothic Revival details, including corner pilasters, an entablature below the roofline, and a dramatic entry portico with attenuated columns, sidelight windows, and a transom window.  The sophistication of the styling is relatively uncommon for what was at the time of its construction a rural agricultural setting.  The house was added to the National Register of Historic Places in 1982.

See also
National Register of Historic Places listings in Andover, Massachusetts
National Register of Historic Places listings in Essex County, Massachusetts

References

Houses in Andover, Massachusetts
National Register of Historic Places in Andover, Massachusetts
Houses on the National Register of Historic Places in Essex County, Massachusetts
1852 establishments in Massachusetts